"Big, Big Love" is a song written and recorded by American country artist Wynn Stewart. It was released as a single in 1961 and became a major hit the same year.

Background and release
"Big, Big Love" was recorded on August 28, 1961 at the Capitol Recording Studio, located in Hollywood, California. The session was produced by Joe Johnson, Stewart's producer at Challenge Records. Three additional tracks were recorded during the same session, including the single's B-side "One More Memory." Stewart had recently signed with Challenge Records after several years at Capitol Records. At Challenge, he adapted a new musical style that incorporated the Bakersfield Sound. The song was Stewart's second self-written tune to be released as a single.

""Big, Big Love"" was released as a single on Challenge Records in September 1961. It was his eighth single release with the label. It spent a total of seven weeks on the Billboard Country and Western Sides chart before becoming a major hit, reaching number 18 in December 1961. "Big, Big Love" was Stewart's third major hit in his recording career and second with the Challenge label. He would achieve his biggest success recording for the Capitol label in later years.

Track listings
7" vinyl single
 "Big, Big Love" – 2:23
 "One More Memory" – 2:10

Chart performance

References

1961 songs
1961 singles
Wynn Stewart songs
Songs written by Wynn Stewart